During the 2009–10 season, the Serbian football club Red Star Belgrade won the Serbian Cup after a 3–0 win against Vojvodina. There were numerous transfers of players into and out of the team.

Squad

Transfers

Transfers in

Transfers out

Competitions

Serbian SuperLiga

Serbian Cup

UEFA Europa League

Second qualifying round

Third qualifying round

Play-off round

See also
 List of Red Star Belgrade seasons

References

Red Star Belgrade seasons
Serbian football clubs 2009–10 season